Volney Erskine Howard (October 22, 1809 – May 14, 1889) was an American lawyer, statesman, and jurist.

Career
Volney Erskine Howard was born in Oxford County, Maine on October 22, 1809, to Richard Howard, a prosperous farmer. At the age of 22,  Howard traveled to Mississippi to study law. He commenced law practice in Brandon, Mississippi. He was a  member of the Mississippi House of Representatives in 1836;  reporter of the supreme court of the State of  Mississippi;  unsuccessful Democratic candidate for election in 1840 to the Twenty-seventh Congress and editor of the Mississippian.

He moved to Texas during the Republic of Texas and Howard was appointed the first Attorney General of the State of Texas in 1846.  He served in that role for only 6 months. He represented Texas's District 2 in the U.S. Congress from 1849 to 1853.

Appointed attorney to the Land Commission of California by President Franklin Pierce, Howard left Texas to move to California. He resigned after a few months to practice law in San Francisco. In 1856, he was appointed Adjutant General of California, following the resignation of William T. Sherman during the time of the San Francisco Committee of Vigilance.  His attempt to oppose the Committee by force failed. Afterward, he moved to Sacramento in 1858 to practice law but decided to leave northern California because he had made too many enemies while battling the vigilantes in San Francisco. In 1861 he moved to Los Angeles, where he served two terms as District Attorney, from 1864 to 1867, and served as one of the first judges of the Los Angeles Superior Court beginning in 1879. His law firm included two of his lawyer sons, Charles Howard (killed in a gunfight with Daniel B. Nichols, son of a former mayor of Los Angeles, in 1869 in a saloon) and Frank H. Howard, who served as city attorney of Los Angeles. He served only one term on the bench, due to the ill health. He was nominated to a seat on the United States Supreme Court but declined because of failing health.

Howard died in Santa Monica, California and was buried at Fort Hill in Los Angeles, California, but was disinterred to an undisclosed location when the cemetery was eliminated. Howard County, Texas was named in his honor.

References

External links
 Column (approx. 2,000 words) on Howard as major-general in charge of state efforts to crush vigilantes' control of San Francisco in 1856
 
 

1809 births
1889 deaths
Democratic Party members of the United States House of Representatives from Texas
Democratic Party members of the Mississippi House of Representatives
Members of the Texas House of Representatives
Texas Attorneys General
District attorneys in California
California local politicians
California state court judges
California Democrats
History of Los Angeles
19th-century American politicians
19th-century American judges